The women's 50 metre freestyle competition of the swimming events at the 2019 Pan American Games was held on 9 August 2019 at the Villa Deportiva Nacional Videna cluster.

Records
Prior to this competition, the existing world and Pan American Games records were as follows:

Results

Heats
The first round was held on August 9.

Swim-off
The swim-off was also held on August 9.

Final B 
The B final was also held on August 9.

Final A 
The A final was also held on August 9.

References

Swimming at the 2019 Pan American Games
2019 in women's swimming